Joshua Baret Henderson (born October 25, 1981) is an American actor, model, and singer. Henderson is best known for his lead role as John Ross Ewing III in the TNT revival of Dallas (2012–2014). He played Austin McCann on the ABC television series Desperate Housewives (2006–2007), and appeared in films like Step Up. He became widely known after his appearance on The WB singing competition show Popstars 2, where he was one of the winners selected to be a member of the pop group Scene 23.

Early life
Henderson was born in Dallas, Texas, the son of Sharon Lea Henderson. He grew up in Tulsa, Oklahoma, where he graduated from Memorial High School in 2000. Due to heterochromia, Henderson's eyes are of different colors; his left eye is green, while the right is blue. Henderson graduated from Tulsa Memorial Senior High School, where he enjoyed playing sports, particularly baseball.

Career
Henderson competed in the second season of The WB reality show Popstars and won a spot in the group Scene 23. After Scene 23, Henderson went on to pursue acting and modeling, as well as continuing his recording career. He appeared in advertisements for Skechers' 4Wheeler Skate shoes between 2002 and 2004. Henderson appeared in several sitcoms, such as Maybe It's Me, Do Over, One on One, Rodney and 8 Simple Rules... for Dating My Teenage Daughter. Henderson made his film debut in the 2003 straight-to-video horror movie Leeches!, and appeared in The Girl Next Door the following year.

In 2005, Henderson was cast in the lead role on the short-lived FX drama series Over There. In film, he is best known for his role in Step Up (2006) as the boyfriend of Jenna Dewan's character. He later played main roles in the horror films Fingerprints (2006), and April Fool's Day (2008), as well as in the romantic comedy The Jerk Theory (2009). For The Jerk Theory, he also recorded the soundtrack album, which was released in 2009. Henderson also appeared in Yours, Mine & Ours (2005), Broken Bridges (2006), and Rushlights (2012). From 2006 to 2007, Henderson co-starred in the ABC comedy-drama series Desperate Housewives as Austin McCann, the nephew of the character Edie Britt, played by Nicollette Sheridan. From 2008 to 2009, he appeared on the CW's 90210, and guest-starred in CSI: Crime Scene Investigation. In 2010, he was cast as the lead character in the unsold CW pilot Betwixt.

In February 2011, Henderson landed a lead role in the TNT revival of the CBS prime-time soap opera Dallas. Henderson played the character of John Ross Ewing III, the son of Sue Ellen (Linda Gray) and J.R. Ewing (Larry Hagman). TNT's Dallas premiered on June 13, 2012. Several critics called Henderson the "breakout star" of the series. Henderson's onscreen chemistry with Julie Gonzalo (Pamela Rebecca Barnes) was praised in the second season. The series was cancelled by TNT after three seasons in 2014. In 2015, Henderson was cast in the male lead role opposite Christine Evangelista in the E! drama series The Arrangement. Henderson portrayed Kyle West, one of the hottest actors in Hollywood. On May 29, 2018, the series concluded after two seasons.

In 2019, he starred in the Blake Shelton produced Time For Me To Come Home For Christmas on the Hallmark Channel, which kicked off the channel's Christmas programming.

Personal life 
Henderson dated singer Ashlee Simpson from 2002 to 2003, former reality show participant Kendal Sheppard from 2006 to 2007, actress Brittany Snow from 2007 to 2008, and television personality Andrea Boehlke from 2013 to 2016. Sheppard maintains that Henderson is the father of her first born son and claimed in 2008 that Henderson was denying paternity or responsibility.

Legal issues
On December 12, 2018, LA police arrested Henderson on suspicion of having broken into his neighbor's house earlier that day. The neighbors allegedly identified Henderson with two other men on surveillance footage taken during the reported crime. TMZ 'reported' that Henderson had an "airtight alibi" for the night of the robbery at his neighbor's home, as he provided security footage that allegedly shows he never left his apartment. On December 19, 2018, the LAPD dropped charges against Henderson due to insufficient evidence.

Filmography

Film

Television

Music videos

References

External links

1981 births
Living people
21st-century American male actors
21st-century American singers
American male film actors
American male models
American male singers
American male soap opera actors
American male television actors
Male actors from Dallas
Male actors from Oklahoma
Male actors from Texas
Male actors from Tulsa, Oklahoma
Male models from Oklahoma
Male models from Texas
Musicians from Dallas
Musicians from Tulsa, Oklahoma
Participants in American reality television series
People from Tulsa, Oklahoma